The Ambassador of the United Kingdom to Lithuania is the United Kingdom's foremost diplomatic representative in the Republic of Lithuania, and in charge of the UK's diplomatic mission in Vilnius.

Heads of Mission

Envoys Extraordinary and Ministers Plenipotentiary 
From 1921 to 1940, British Ministers were accredited to Estonia and Latvia as well as Lithuania; they were based in Riga.

1921–1922: Ernest Wilton
1922–1927: Sir Tudor Vaughan
1928–1930: Joseph Addison
1931–1934: Hughe Knatchbull-Hugessen
1934–1937: Sir Edmund Monson, 3rd Baronet
1937–1940: Sir Charles Orde

No representation 1940–91. Lithuania was incorporated into the Soviet Union in 1940, and regained its independence in 1991.

Ambassadors 
1991–1994: Michael Peart
1995–1998: Tom Macan
1998–2001: Christopher Robbins
2001–2003: Jeremy Hill
2004–2008: Colin Roberts
2007–2011: Simon Butt
2011–2015: David Hunt
2015–2019: Claire Lawrence

2019–: Brian Olley

References

External links
UK and Lithuania, gov.uk

Lithuania
 
United Kingdom